The Ghostly Face is a 1972 Hong Kong film.

References

External links

1972 films
1972 multilingual films
1970s action films
1970s Mandarin-language films
1972 martial arts films
Indonesian multilingual films
Hong Kong multilingual films
Indonesian martial arts films
Hong Kong martial arts films
Indonesian-language films
Cockfighting in film
1970s Hong Kong films